Oriol Tarragó (Reus, Tarragona, 1976), is a sound designer and film post-production supervisor. He is also a teacher at the Escuela Superior de Cine y Audiovisuales de Cataluña (ESCAC), attached to the University of Barcelona.

He has designed the sound design of many Spanish and international films such as [REC], The Orphanage (2007), The Impossible (2012), Enemy (2013) Crimson Peak (2015), Penny Dreadful (2014), A Monster Call (2018), Jurassic World: Fallen Kingdom(2018). He won four Goya Awards from the Spanish Film Academy, seven Gaudí Award from the Catalan Film Academy and one Golden Reel Award from the Motion Sound Picture Editors. In 2018 he was awarded Best European Sound Designer by the European Film Academy.

He is a member of the Spanish Film Academy and the Academy of Motion Picture Arts and Sciences.

Biography 
He graduated from the Escola Superior de Cinema i Audiovisuals de Catalunya - (Cinema and Audivisuals School of Catalonia), with the documentary Pura (1999) after receiving a scholarship for a six-month stay at the Singapore`s Ngee Ann Polytechnic.

Career 
Upon his return from Singapore, he worked with Guillermo del Toro on The Devil’s Backbone (2001) and with fellow graduate from Escola Superior de Cinema, Juan Antonio Bayona on Bayona´s first short films.

He then moved to New York, where he studied film postproduction at New York University (NYU), and on to London to work as a sound editor.

He returned to Barcelona to do The Orphanage (2007) with Bayona and began to work for directors such as Jaume Balagueró, Kike Maíllo, Denis Villeneuve or Daniel Monzón, Edmón Roch, as well as for Juan Antonio Bayona’s subsequent films.

He currently works from his studio Coser y Cantar in central Barcelona and is teaching sound design at Escola Superior de Cinema Film School. He is also involved in several projects with studios in San Francisco, Toronto and London.

Filmography (selection)

References 

1976 births
Living people
People from Reus
Sound editors
Academic staff of the University of Barcelona
New York University alumni
Spanish expatriates in the United States
Spanish expatriates in the United Kingdom